Fran Stenson (born 27 April 2001) is an English footballer who plays as a goalkeeper for Sheffield United currently on loan from Arsenal in the FA Women's Championship.

Club career
Fran Stenson made her professional debut on 1 October 2017 when she came on as a second-half substitute for Ann-Katrin Berger in Birmingham City's 2–1 win over Everton in the FA WSL, though she had previously started for England U17s a few weeks earlier. Following a transfer to Manchester City, she made her full club start in the FA WSL Cup against Aston Villa on 13 December 2018.

In February 2019, Stenson went on loan to Blackburn Rovers of the FA Women's National League North. She was understudying Karen Bardsley and Ellie Roebuck at Manchester City, while Blackburn urgently required a goalkeeper following injuries to both Danielle Gibbons and Danielle Hill.

During preseason, Stenson appeared as part of the Arsenal squad during the Emirates Cup. She officially signed with the team on 16 August 2019. On 6 September 2019, Stenson returned to Blackburn Rovers on loan, this time in the FA Women's Championship.

Career statistics

Club

References

External links
 

2001 births
Living people
English women's footballers
Women's association football goalkeepers
Women's Super League players
Manchester City W.F.C. players
Birmingham City W.F.C. players
Blackburn Rovers L.F.C. players
Sheffield United W.F.C. players
Arsenal W.F.C. players
England women's youth international footballers